Hussein Fahmi  (born 1 January 1984) is an Egyptian footballer who currently plays for Egyptian Premier League club Itthad Alexandria. He is a tireless midfielder, who can also play as a defensive midfielder or an attacking one.

References

1984 births
Living people
Egyptian footballers
People from Cairo Governorate
Association football midfielders
Al Ittihad Alexandria Club players